Born to Be Wild is a 2011 American nature documentary short film about orphaned orangutans and elephants. It was directed by David Lickley, written and produced by Drew Fellman. It was distributed in the United States by Warner Bros. Pictures and IMAX Pictures. The film was released April 8, 2011, and is narrated by Morgan Freeman. There was a Premiere of the film in Montreal, Quebec on March 30, 2011, at 9:30 AM at the Montreal Science Centre IMAX Telus Theatre for Two Montreal Primary schools and two secondary schools.

In March 2012, it won the Genesis Award for Best Documentary Feature from The Humane Society of the United States "for its celebration of the people rehabilitating baby elephants and orangutans orphaned by poaching and habitat encroachment".

Critical reception
The film has received overwhelmingly positive reviews, receiving a 98% "fresh" score on Rotten Tomatoes, based on 41 reviews. Its critical consensus states: "The human story of Born to Be Wild is captivating and the accompanying nature footage is utterly cute and charming."

References

External links
 
 
 
 
 

2011 3D films
2011 short documentary films
American short documentary films
American 3D films
3D short films
Documentary films about nature
Films about apes
American independent films
Warner Bros. films
IMAX short films
Films scored by Mark Mothersbaugh
Films about elephants
Films set in Indonesia
Films set in Kenya
IMAX documentary films
2011 films
2011 independent films
2010s English-language films
2010s American films